The Comet, sometimes called the Comet OD or Comet One-Design, is an American sailing dinghy that was designed by C. Lowndes Johnson as a one-design racer and first built in 1932. The design has evolved over time via modifications.

The design was intended as a smaller version of the Star keelboat, making it easier to transport.

Production
The design was first shown in an article in Yachting in 1932 and was initially built from wood by the Skaneateles Boat & Canoe Co. Later builders included the Lippincott Boat Works, Customflex and Siddons & Sindle. The current builder is Whitecap Composites of Peabody, Massachusetts,  United States. It remains in production, with more than 4,100 boats completed in total.

Plans for the design remain available for amateur construction.

Design
The Comet is a recreational planing sailboat, built predominantly of wood or fiberglass. It has a fractional sloop rig with aluminum spars, running backstays and an optional headstay. The hull features hard chines, a spooned raked stem, an angled transom, a rounded, transom-hung rudder controlled by a tiller and a retractable, drum-controlled, metal centerboard. The boat displaces .

To keep it up to date, the class association has allowed modifications to the design over the years, including the addition of self-bailers, a full width mainsheet traveler, windows in the mainsail and jib for visibility and buoyancy tanks to make the boat unsinkable.

The boat has a boom vang and adjustable backstays. It has two different rigging options, one with three stays supporting the mast and an alternate rig with a jumper and seven stays. Current factory options include a ball-bearing mainsheet traveler, mast rake controls and leading of all lines to the cockpit for control while hiking.

The design has a Portsmouth Yardstick racing average handicap of 92.0 and is normally raced with a crew of two sailors.

Operational history
The design is supported by an active class club, the Comet Class Association. The association has 14 fleets in the eastern US, plus one in Bermuda.

In a 1994 review Richard Sherwood wrote, "an older design, the Comet has many modern features. The bottom is flat and the afterbody is broad. She planes. The Comet is a one-design with rigid controls on size, shape, and materials. Minor modifications through the years have kept her up-to-date."

See also
List of sailing boat types

Related development
Star (keelboat)

References

External links

Dinghies
1930s sailboat type designs
Two-person sailboats
Sailboat type designs by C. Lowndes Johnson
Sailboat types built by Siddons & Sindle
Sailboat types built by Whitecap Composites
Sailboat types built by Lippincott Boat Works
Sailboat types built by Customflex
Sailboat types built by Skaneateles Boat & Canoe Co.